The Classico algérien is the name given to matches between MC Alger and JS Kabylie, This name is inspired by the Spanish El Clásico between Real Madrid CF and FC Barcelona.

MC Alger represents the capital of the country Algiers while JS Kabylie (more titled Algerian clubs) represents Kabylia. These meetings became important, following the case n ° 107 of the disciplinary committee concerning the JSK-MCA match, which caused serious incidents on and around the field during the 1962–63 season. Indeed this case constitutes the first serious case, treated by the disciplinary commission of the very young Algerian football championship, called "critérium honneur". Heavy sanctions are imposed on the two teams, press releases are made public to the attention of the clubs of the League of Algiers and to the Algerian people as a whole in order to recall respect for the practice of this sport and also to improve the image of the country abroad. Since this affair the matches between the two clubs have been strewn with a certain rivalry where each of the two clubs must not lose to the other. Despite this painful episode in the early days of Algerian football some matches remain sporting references for supporters of both camps because they are two of the most successful clubs in Algeria whether on the continental, regional or national level.

History

MC Alger is known to be the dean of Algerian football and JS Kabylie is known to be the most successful. Both have a well-stocked record, and have been part of Algerian football folklore since the independence of Algeria. Their domination is not limited to the borders of Algeria, but also in Africa and in the Arab world. JSK with its seven African trophies and MCA, the first Algerian club to win an African cup, have often played the leading roles in international competitions. There is also the fact that these two clubs often compete for the head of the championship, but this is not the only point, there are two other causes that led to the birth of this rivalry. First of all, the two clubs have a common history since the beginnings of Algerian football. Indeed it must be remembered that during the colonial period, the JSK, a young newly created sports association, was refused subsidies from the colonial government of the time, in the town of Tizi Ouzou. He prefers to help the colonial team of the Olympique de Tizi-Ouzou which is an older formation, rather than to help the new Muslim sports association. Having no sports equipment, JS Kabylie receives help from other clubs, such as Widad Rihadi de Belcourt (one of the clubs that merged to create CR Belouizdad) USM Blida and MC Alger. These three clubs among other things donated jerseys in order to allow JSK to structure itself and also donations from the local population. The canaries which currently wear the colors yellow and green have long wore the colors red and green because their first jerseys are offered to them by MCA wearing these same colors.

All-time head-to-head results

All-Time Top Scorers

Hat-tricks
A hat-trick is achieved when the same player scores three or more goals in one match. Listed in chronological order.

Honours

League matches

Algerian Cup results

League Cup results

Super Cup results

Shared player history

Players who have played for both clubs

  Mourad Aït Tahar (JS Kabylie 1987–94 & 1997–99, MC Alger 1994–97)
  Mounir Dob (MC Alger 1994–95, JS Kabylie 2000–03)
  Fodil Dob (MC Alger 1994–2002, JS Kabylie 2002–03)
  Karim Braham Chaouch (MC Alger 2001 & 2002–06, JS Kabylie 2009)
  Koceila Berchiche (JS Kabylie 2008–11 & 2015–17, MC Alger 2014–15)
  Nabil Yaâlaoui (JS Kabylie 2010–11, MC Alger 2011–14)
  Sid Ali Yahia-Chérif (JS Kabylie 2009–11, MC Alger 2013–14)
  Farouk Belkaïd (JS Kabylie 1998–2005, MC Alger 2006–08)
  Lounés Bendahmane (JS Kabylie 2000–06, MC Alger 2006–07)
  Toufik Zeghdane (MC Alger 2013–16, JS Kabylie 2019–20)
  Abdelmalek Mokdad (MC Alger 2009–11 & 2015–17, JS Kabylie 2012–13)
  Sofiane Younès (MC Alger 2005–09 & 2012, JS Kabylie 2010–11)

  Noureddine Daham (JS Kabylie 2002–03, MC Alger 2004–06)
  Nabil Saâdou (JS Kabylie 2017–20, MC Alger 2020–present)
  Toufik Addadi (JS Kabylie 2019–20, MC Alger 20–present)
  Mehdi Benaldjia (JS Kabylie 2017–18, MC Alger 2018–present)
  Ibrahim Amada (JS Kabylie 2011, MC Alger 2017–19)
  Sid Ahmed Aouadj (JS Kabylie 2013–14, MC Alger 2014–17)
  Mohamed Seguer (JS Kabylie 2010, MC Alger 2016–18)
  Faouzi Chaouchi (JS Kabylie 2006–09, MC Alger 2011–13 & 2014–18)
  Hocine Metref (JS Kabylie 2011–12, MC Alger 2012–14)
  Mohamed Derrag (JS Kabylie 2007–09, MC Alger 2009–11)

Played for one, managed the other
 Djamel Menad (as player JS Kabylie, as manager MC Alger)

Coaches who managed both clubs

  Noureddine Saâdi (JS Kabylie 1992–94 & 2018, MC Alger 2003 & 2006)
  Alain Geiger (JS Kabylie 2010, MC Alger 2013)

Algerian Ligue Professionnelle 1 results

Notes

References
Notes

Bibliography

 
 

JS Kabylie
MC Alger
Football rivalries in Algeria